Lily Ramonatxo (born 24 February 2005) is a French individual rhythmic gymnast. She is the reigning French National all-around silver medalist in 2022, and was the bronze medalist the year before. Internationally, she placed 24th during the all-around competition at the 2022 European Championships in Tel Aviv.

Career 

Lily Ramonatxo started rhythmic gymnastics at 8 years old after watching the 2011 World Rhythmic Gymnastics Championships in her hometown, Montpellier. She began her career with coach Sandrine Cabrera in Montpellier 3M GRS club, before switching with Alexandra Konova when she joined the national youth training hub in the same city. Her first competition as a national team member was the International Tournament in Corbeil-Essonnes, France. The next year, she won the silver medal in the all-around at the French national junior championships, along with a gold in the ribbon final and a bronze with clubs.
Thanks to her results, she was selected to represent France at the 2019 Junior World Rhythmic Gymnastics Championships in Moscow, Russia. She competed with the rope, and finished 23rd with a score of 13.950.
In 2020, her last junior season, she won silver with clubs at the Corbeil-Essonnes International tournament. She also won three medals at the Fellbach Schmiden tournament in Germany: two silvers with ribbon and clubs, and a bronze with ball.
Due to the COVID-19 pandemic, most of the events in the season were cancelled. Her final junior competition was the 2020 Rhythmic Gymnastics European Championships in Kyiv, postponed in November. With her teammate Elsa Somville and the group, she finished 4th in the team competition. She qualified to three finals: she finished 7th with rope and clubs and 8th with ball.

References

French rhythmic gymnasts
2005 births
Living people
21st-century French women